Vanesa Santana (born 3 September 1990) is an Argentine professional footballer who plays as a midfielder for Spanish Primera División club Sporting de Huelva and the Argentina women's national team.

International career
Santana represented Argentina at the 2008 South American U-20 Women's Championship, 2008 FIFA U-20 Women's World Cup and the 2010 South American U-20 Women's Championship. She made her senior debut in 2011.

References

1990 births
Living people
People from La Matanza Partido
Sportspeople from Buenos Aires Province
Argentine women's footballers
Women's association football midfielders
Boca Juniors (women) footballers
Atlético Huila (women) players
América de Cali (women) players
EdF Logroño players
Primera División (women) players
Argentina women's youth international footballers
Argentina women's international footballers
2019 FIFA Women's World Cup players
Footballers at the 2015 Pan American Games
Pan American Games silver medalists for Argentina
Pan American Games medalists in football
Footballers at the 2019 Pan American Games
South American Games gold medalists for Argentina
South American Games medalists in football
Competitors at the 2014 South American Games
Argentine expatriate women's footballers
Argentine expatriate sportspeople in Venezuela
Expatriate women's footballers in Venezuela
Argentine expatriate sportspeople in Colombia
Expatriate women's footballers in Colombia
Argentine expatriate sportspeople in Spain
Expatriate women's footballers in Spain
Medalists at the 2019 Pan American Games
Sporting de Huelva players